Okchun-dang or okchun, called saek-kusŭl-sathang ("colour marble candy") in North Korea, is a traditional Korean sweet made of rice flour. The flat, rounded sweet is red with white, yellow, and green decoration.

It is a staple on the table for various traditional ceremonies such as jesa (ancestral rite) and hwangap (60th birthday).

Gallery

References 

Candy
Hangwa
Korean desserts